Janardan Yadav is an Indian politician. He was elected to the Lok Sabha, lower house of the Parliament of India from Godda, Jharkhand as a member of the Bharatiya Janata Party .

References

1942 births
Living people
People from Bhagalpur district
People from Godda district
Bharatiya Janata Party politicians from Jharkhand
India MPs 1989–1991
Lok Sabha members from Jharkhand
Members of the Bihar Legislative Assembly
State cabinet ministers of Bihar
Members of the Jharkhand Legislative Assembly
Janata Party politicians